Anton Lichkov (: born 5 August 1980 in Petrich) is a Bulgarian former footballer, who played as a defender.

External links
 
 2007-08 Statistics, 2006-07 Statistics & 2005-06 Statistics at PFL.bg

1980 births
Living people
Bulgarian footballers
First Professional Football League (Bulgaria) players
PFC Slavia Sofia players
PFC Beroe Stara Zagora players
PFC Belasitsa Petrich players
FC Montana players
People from Petrich
Association football defenders
Sportspeople from Blagoevgrad Province